The electoral district of Clarence was a single-member electoral district of the Tasmanian House of Assembly. It was based in the region across the Derwent River from Hobart in what is now the eastern suburbs, including Bellerive and Rokeby as well as the South Arm Peninsula.

The seat was created ahead of the Assembly's first election held in 1856, and was abolished at the 1886 election.

Members for Clarence

References
 
 
 Parliament of Tasmania (2006). The Parliament of Tasmania from 1956

Clarence